Marquis Zhuang of Cai (蔡莊侯) (?–612 BC), born Jī Jiǎwǔ (姫甲午), was the fifteenth ruler of the State of Cai from 645 BC to 612 BC.  He was the only known son of Marquess Mu of Cai (蔡穆侯), his predecessor. His reign was a period of 34 years. He was succeeded by his son.

References 
 Shiji
 Chinese Wikipedia
 Chinese Text Project
 chinaknowledge.de/History/Zhou/rulers-cai

Zhou dynasty nobility
Cai (state)
7th-century BC Chinese monarchs